Sylvain Julien Victor Arend (6 August 1902 – 18 February 1992) was a Belgian astronomer born in Robelmont, Luxembourg province, Belgium. His main interest was astrometry.

Together with Georges Roland, he discovered the bright comet C/1956 R1 (Arend-Roland). He also discovered, or co-discovered, the periodic comets 49P/Arend-Rigaux and 50P/Arend, Nova Scuti 1952, and a number of asteroids, including notably the Amor asteroid 1916 Boreas and the Trojan asteroid 1583 Antilochus. He also discovered 1652 Hergé which is named after Hergé, the creator of The Adventures of Tintin. The asteroid 1563 Noël is named after his son, Emanuel Arend.

In 1948 Arend started together with sixteen other people the skeptic organisation Comité Para. The outer main-belt asteroid 1502 Arenda was named in his honor.

List of discovered minor planets

References 
 

1902 births
1992 deaths
20th-century Belgian astronomers
Belgian skeptics
Discoverers of asteroids
Discoverers of comets

People from Meix-devant-Virton